Louis Houde (October 2, 1879 – December 9, 1945) was a Canadian provincial politician.

Born in Deschaillons, Quebec, Houde was mayor of Plessisville from 1910 to 1913. He was the member of the Legislative Assembly of Quebec for Mégantic from 1939 to 1940.

References

1879 births
1945 deaths
Mayors of places in Quebec
People from Centre-du-Québec
Quebec Liberal Party MNAs